Mesić is a village in Serbia. It is situated in the Vršac municipality, in the South Banat District, Vojvodina province. The village has a Romanian (87.22%) ethnic majority and its population numbering 202 people (2011 census). The village is best known for the Serbian Orthodox Mesić Monastery.

See also
List of places in Serbia
List of cities, towns and villages in Vojvodina

Populated places in Serbian Banat
Populated places in South Banat District
Vršac
Romanian communities in Serbia